Borstendorf is a village and a former municipality in the district Erzgebirgskreis, in Saxony, Germany. Since 1 January 2015 it is part of the municipality Grünhainichen.

References 

Erzgebirgskreis